Zgornji Janževski Vrh is a small dispersed settlement in the Pohorje Hills in northeastern Slovenia. It lies in the Municipality of Ribnica na Pohorju. The area is part of the traditional Styria region. The municipality is now included in the Carinthia Statistical Region.

History
Zgornji Janževski Vrh was established as a separate settlement in 1994, when it was split off from Janževski Vrh in the neighboring Municipality of Podvelka.

References

External links
Zgornji Janževski Vrh on Geopedia

Populated places in the Municipality of Ribnica na Pohorju